The Central Algonquian languages are commonly grouped together as a subgroup of the larger Algonquian family, itself a member of the Algic family. Though the grouping is often encountered in the literature, it is an areal grouping, not a genetic grouping. In other words, the languages are grouped together because they were spoken near one another, not because they are more closely related to one another than to other Algonquian languages. Within the Algonquian family, only Eastern Algonquian is a valid genealogical group.

Within the Central Algonquian grouping, Potawatomi and Chippewa, otherwise known as Ojibwe, are closely related and are generally grouped together as an Ojibwa-Potawatomi sub-branch. "Eastern Great Lakes" was first proposed by Richard Rhodes in 1988, and first discussed by Ives Goddard as "Core Central" in 1994.  In Goddard's assessment, he divides the "Core Central" into the Ojibwa-Potawatomi and Miami-Illinois group, and the Sauk-Fox-Kickapoo and Shawnee group; the hypothesis for the subgroup was based on lexical and phonological innovations.  David J. Costa in his 2003 book The Miami-Illinois Language agrees with Rhodes and Goddard that Central Algonquian has a specific language sub-branch that he refers to as "Eastern Great Lakes" but in his assessment Costa also states "...there seems to be no evidence that Miami-Illinois is closer to Ojibwe-Potawatomi than it is to Sauk-Fox-Kickapoo."

Family division
The languages are listed below along with dialects and subdialects. This classification follows Goddard (1996) and Mithun (1999).

1. Cree-Montagnais (also known as Kirištino˙ or Cree-Montagnais-Naskapi)
 i. Cree
 Plains Cree
 Woods Cree
 Western Swampy Cree
 Eastern Swampy Cree and Moose Cree
 Atikamekw (also known as Attikamek, Attikamekw, Atikamek or Tête de Boule)
 ii. Montagnais-Naskapi
 East Cree (also known as James Bay Cree or Eastern Cree)
 Northern East Cree
 Southern East Cree
 Naskapi
 Montagnais (also known as Innu-aimun or Innu)
2. Menominee (also known as Menomini)
? Eastern Great Lakes (also known as Core Central)
 Ojibwe–Potawatomi (also known as Ojibwe–Potawatomi–Ottawa, Anishinaabemowin, or the Anishinaabe language)
 3. Ojibwe (also known as Ojibwa, Ojibway, Ojibwe–Ottawa, Ojibwemowin or the Anishinaabe language)
 i. Northern
 Algonquin
 Oji-Cree (also known as Severn Ojibwe, Anishininiimowin or the Anishinini language)
 ii. Southern
 Saulteaux (also known as Nakawēmowin, Plains Ojibwe or Western Ojibwe)
 Eastern Ojibwe (also known as Mississauga Ojibwa or Jibwemwin)
 Southwestern Ojibwe (also known as Chippewa, Ojibwe, Ojibwa, Ojibwemowin or Ojibway)
 Ottawa (also known as Odawa or Daawaamwin)
 Northern Ojibwe (also known as Northwestern Ojibwe)
 Nipissing Algonquin (also known simply as Algonquin)
 4. Potawatomi
 5. Fox (also known as Fox-Sauk-Kickapoo or Mesquakie-Sauk-Kickapoo)
 Fox (also known as Meskwaki, Mesquakie, or Meshkwahkihaki)
 Sauk (also known as Sac or Thakiwaki)
 Kickapoo
 Mascouten (unattested)
 6. Shawnee
 7. Miami-Illinois
 Miami
 Illinois
 Peoria
 Wea

See also
Proto-Algonquian language
Algonquian peoples

References

External links
Algonquian Family
Algonquian languages

Bibliography
 Campbell, Lyle (1997). American Indian languages: The historical linguistics of Native America. New York: Oxford University Press. .
 Goddard, Ives (1994). "The West-to-East Cline in Algonquian Dialectology." In William Cowan, ed., Papers of the 25th Algonquian Conference 187-211. Ottawa: Carleton University.
———— (1996). "Introduction". In Ives Goddard, ed., "Languages". Vol. 17 of William Sturtevant, ed., The Handbook of North American Indians. Washington, D.C.: The Smithsonian Institution.
 Mithun, Marianne (1999). The languages of Native North America. Cambridge: Cambridge University Press.  (hbk); .

 
Algic languages
First Nations languages in Canada
Potawatomi